Nyctimenius varicornis is a species of beetle in the family Cerambycidae. It was described by Johan Christian Fabricius in 1801. It is known from Java, Cambodia, Singapore, Borneo, Sumatra, Malaysia, and Taiwan.

References

Lamiinae
Beetles described in 1801